This is a list of airlines currently operating in the Comoros.

See also
 List of airlines
 List of defunct airlines of the Comoros
 List of companies based in the Comoros

Comoros

Airlines
Airlines
Comoros